The Emilia-Romagna regional election of 1985 took place on 12 May 1985.

The Italian Communist Party was by far the largest party, with almost twice the votes of Christian Democracy. After the election Lanfranco Turci, the incumbent Communist President of the Region, formed a new government with the support of the Italian Socialist Party. Turci, elected senator, was replaced by Luciano Guerzoni in 1987.

Results

1985 elections in Italy
1985 regional election
1985
May 1985 events in Europe